A Tribute To Amália Rodrigues (also known as Nova Sintra) is a compilation album in tribute to Amália Rodrigues.  It was recorded in Lisbon in 2004 by the Dutch-based label World Connection and released on CD.  The compilation features various singers, mainly of Latin origin, who sing versions of the fadista in different styles.

Track listing
 Introdução - Custódio Castelo
 Ai Maria - Ciganos D'Ouro
 Lágrima - Argentina Santos
 Morrinha - Dany Silva
 Grito - Jorge Fernando
 Trago Fados Nos Sentidos - Raul Marques e Os Amigos Da Salsa
 Tive Um Coraçao Perdi-o - Cristina Branco
 Se Deixas De Ser Quem És - Terra D'Agua
 Pinhero Meu Irmão - Carlos Macedo e António Manuel Polarigo
 Asa De Vento - Vozes da Rádio
 Filha De Hervas - Ana Moura
 Amor De Mel, Amor De Fel - V Império
 Trago Fado Nos Sentidos - Joana Amendoeira
 Estranha Forma De Vida - Segue-me à Capela
 O Fado Chora-se Bem - Maria da Fé
 Quando Se Gosta De Alguém - Ricardo Ribeiro
 Olha a Ribeirinha - Negros De Luz

References

External links
Amália Rodrigues at World Connection

Amália Rodrigues albums
2004 albums